Avshalom Cave, known in academic literature as Soreq Cave) an popularly as Stalactites Cave, is a 5,000 m2 cave on the western side of Mt. Ye'ela, in the Judean hills in Israel, unique for its dense concentration of stalactites and other cave formations.

The cave has been the focus of paleoclimate research, which allowed reconstruction of the region's semi-arid climate for the past 185,000 years.  According to the American geologist James Aronson, the Soreq Cave Nature Reserve is the Rosetta stone of climate history in the Eastern Mediterranean.

Name
The cave is named after the Soreq Valley (Nahal Soreq) and after Avshalom Shoham, an Israeli soldier killed in the War of Attrition.

Location
Avshalom Cave is situated near Hartuv, 3 km east of Bet Shemesh, Israel.

Discovery
The cave was discovered accidentally in May 1968, while quarrying with explosives.

After its discovery, the location of the cave was kept a secret for several years for fear of damage to its natural treasures.

Tourism
The cave is now open to visitors, in the heart of the 67-dunam Avshalom Nature Reserve, declared in 1975. In 2012, a new lighting system was installed to prevent the formation and growth of algae.

Description
The cave is 83 m long, 60 m wide, and 15 m high.

The temperature and the humidity in the cave are constant year round.

Some of the stalactites found in the cave are four meters long, and some have been dated as 300,000 years old. Some meet stalagmites to form stone pillars.

Gallery

See also
Geography of Israel
Tourism in Israel

References

External links
 Stalactite Cave Nature Reserve at Israel Nature and Parks Authority website
 Photos of Avshalom Stalactites Cave, Flickr

Limestone caves
Caves of Israel
Show caves in Israel
Nature reserves in Israel
Landforms of Central District (Israel)
Protected areas of Central District (Israel)